The 1957–58 season was Stoke City's 51st season in the Football League and the 18th in the Second Division.

The pressure was now beginning to increase on Frank Taylor with the club gearing up for another season in the second tier. Taylor believed he was building a useful and settled squad however the supporters were starting to get impatient with him. The 1957–58 season was again a huge disappointment as after a good first half of the season was followed up by a poor second half and they ended up in 11th position.

Season review

League
Prior to the start of the 1957–58 season both George Bourne and John Malkin had to retire from playing due to injury. Despite this the management left the transfer market alone during the summer of 1957 with Frank Taylor saying: I am slowly getting together a useful squad and building a settled side. However the club was still short on forward players with only five available these of Frank Bowyer, Neville Coleman, Johnny King, George Kelly and Harry Oscroft. Yet to their credit these five kept the goals flowing with Kelly top scoring with 24 to his name.

The 1957–58 season again proved to be a big disappointment and whilst until December Stoke were in the top two, they ended up in 11th place with absolutely nothing to show for the early efforts. Taylor did go out and spend £11,000 on Dennis Wilshaw from Wolverhampton Wanderers and long serving Frank Mountford bowed out after eight years and took up a coaching role a position he would keep until 1980.

The fruits of the club's youth policy were slowly play dividends with the emergence this season of Tony Allen a quality full back who go on to win international honours with England. Peter Bullock also came through the youth team whilst he did not have a very successful career with Stoke he made his debut against Swansea Town at the age of 16 and 163 days old and he scored becoming the club's youngest player and goalscorer.

FA Cup
Stoke made in-roads in the FA Cup overcoming Aston Villa in a 2nd replay and then Middlesbrough to reach the fifth round where they came up against a powerful Bolton Wanderers side who with the help of Nat Lofthouse beat Stoke 3–1 as they went on to lift the cup.

Final league table

Results

Stoke's score comes first

Legend

Football League Second Division

FA Cup

Squad statistics

References

Stoke City F.C. seasons
Stoke